Tamasin Ramsay (born 1969) is an Australian anthropologist and former actress. She studied medical anthropology at the University of Melbourne and received her PhD in the same field from Monash University in 2009. Ramsay resides in Victoria, Australia.

Acting career
Her parents are Robin Ramsay and Barbara Bossert Ramsay (actress and writer). As a child she worked as an actor, with roles in an ABC Television series, The Truckies, and the film Dimboola. At age 17, she was cast in the Australian television series Possession (1985). She played Princess Talitha in Return to Eden (1986), followed by roles in Prime Time (1986), Neighbours (1987), Darlings of the Gods (1989), The Great Gatsby (Rippon Lea, directed by Robert Chuter), Blue Heelers (2001), Queen of the Damned (2002), and Tao of the Traveller (2008), a film based on a theatre script and book written by Barbara Bossert Ramsay, and produced and directed by her father, Robin Ramsay.

Later interests
During the 1990s, Ramsay left television and became a qualified ambulance paramedic in Melbourne. She was awarded a number of commendations during her paramedic career. During the 1990s Ramsay also earned her black belt in Gōjū Kai karate after winning a number of national and international titles in martial arts.. While continuing to volunteer in the health and emergency services, Ramsay attended graduate school at the University of Melbourne and was awarded a PhD for studies in anthropology and health at Monash University in 2009, for which she wrote an in-depth ethnographic study of the Brahma Kumaris as her thesis.

Between 2010 and 2014, she worked as an NGO Representative to the United Nations for the Brahma Kumaris World Spiritual University, focussing on climate change, sustainability and the environment.

Current career 
After representing civil society at the United Nations and participating in climate change deliberations, Ramsay returned to working at the level of local communities as an activist for social, environmental and animal justice. Ramsay ran in the seat of Albert Park, in the 2018 Victoria state election. She now works as Senior Policy Advisor to Andy Meddick (Member for Western Victoria, Animal Justice Party). and is the candidate for Lowan in the 2022 Victorian state election.

References

External links

Brahma Kumaris Research

Living people
20th-century Australian actresses
21st-century Australian actresses
Actresses from Melbourne
Australian child actresses
Australian film actresses
Australian soap opera actresses
Brahma Kumaris
Year of birth uncertain
University of Melbourne alumni
Monash University alumni
Australian anthropologists
Australian women anthropologists
1960s births